Park Hee-Chul (born January 7, 1986) is a South Korea football player who plays for Pohang Steelers. From January 2008 to June 2008, he was loaned to Gyeongnam FC from Pohang Steelers.

Club career statistics

References

External links
 
 FIFA Player Statistics

1986 births
Living people
Association football midfielders
South Korean footballers
Pohang Steelers players
Gyeongnam FC players
Ansan Mugunghwa FC players
K League 1 players
K League 2 players